Jacqueshuberia loretensis is a species of legume in the family Fabaceae.
It is found only in Peru.

References

Caesalpinioideae
Trees of Peru
Vulnerable plants
Taxonomy articles created by Polbot